Lake Gregory may refer to:

 Lake Gregory (South Australia)
 Lake Gregory (Western Australia)
 Lake Gregory (Queensland), Australia, also known as Isis Balancing Storage
 Gregory Lake (La Jacques-Cartier), Quebec, Canada
 Lake Gregory (California), United States
 Lake Gregory (Nuwara Eliya), Sri Lanka

See also
 Gregory (disambiguation)
 Gregoire Lake (disambiguation)